Isofucosterol, or 28-Isofucosterol, sometimes incorrectly called Δ-5-Avenasterol, is the E–Z isomer of Fucosterol and position isomer of Δ-7-Avenasterol. Isofucosterol is a natural, stigmastane-type sterol, mainly distributed in marine sponge.

References

Sterols
Isopropyl compounds